Suzanne de Sainte-Croix (born 11 June 1867, date of death unknown) was a French sculptor. Her work was part of the sculpture event in the art competition at the 1928 Summer Olympics.

References

1867 births
Year of death missing
20th-century French sculptors
French women sculptors
Olympic competitors in art competitions
People from Lyon Metropolis
20th-century French women